The Suvidha Express also called as Premium Express series of trains were introduced by Indian Railways in 2014 for the 1st time which is operated in busiest routes. They were intended to follow dynamic pricing in fares similar to that of airlines contrary to the standard one fare for one class of travel generally followed by Indian Railways. Priority of Premium trains are above Superfast and Mail/Express trains like Shatabdi Express, Duronto Express and Rajdhani Express.

Overview
The Premium AC special train from Mumbai to Delhi was the first train which was launched on 24 December 2013 during festive season of Christmas and New Year. The train's maiden journey earned 48 percent more than the Mumbai — Delhi Rajdhani that ran during the same period. Encouraged by the successful run of the Mumbai-Delhi premium train, In Railway budget 2014, D. V. Sadananda Gowda, the railway minister announced 5 more such premium AC-special trains on busy routes.

Features

 Dynamic fare pricing will be followed in this type of train with fare being increased for subsequent bookings.
 Only a 15-day Advance reservation period will be permitted for this train with no agent booking allowed.
 There will be no waitlisted ticket issued & no modification of ticket or upgradation is permitted.
 Only e-tickets will be issued & booking is permitted only through IRCTC's website.
 There will be no quota for ladies/tatkal etc. & no concession (senior citizen, disabled etc.) is permitted.
 Identity card details are required at the time of booking tickets.
 No cancellation is permitted with the only exception being if Indian Railways cancels the train.
 Vacant seats after charting will be available at the respective current booking counters of the train originating station.

Numbering

As similar to the other trains of Indian Railways, these trains also have five digits. Only change is that, the first digit (from Left) is 8. Example: 82615.

Routes

See also
 Dedicated Intercity trains of India
 Rajdhani Express
 https://www.irctc.co.in/betaDoc/list%20of%20dynamic%20train%20running%20in%20prod.pdf

References 

 http://www.wr.indianrailways.gov.in/view_detail.jsp?lang=0&dcd=1960&id=0,4,268
 http://www.wr.indianrailways.gov.in/view_detail.jsp?lang=0&dcd=1744&id=0,4,268
 http://www.nr.indianrailways.gov.in/view_detail.jsp?lang=0&dcd=3581&id=0,4,268
 http://pib.nic.in/newsite/erelease.aspx?relid=102069
 http://www.dnaindia.com/mumbai/report-railway-gives-premium-trains-halts-to-increase-popularity-1975815

External links